The Judo competition at the 1998 Asian Games was contested in fourteen weight classes, seven each for men and women, held at the Thammasat University in Thailand.

Schedule

Medalists

Men

Women

Medal table

References 

Results
Top 8

External links
 
 Olympic Council of Asia

 
1998 Asian Games events
1998
Asian Games
1998 Asian Games